What Happened to Jean is a 1918 Australian silent film shot in South Australia. It is a lost film.

Plot
Country girl Jean sets out to see the world. She arrives in Adelaide, runs into villainous Ashbourne, and wins a car in a competition conducted by the Trench Comfort Fund. She meets a socialite called Mrs de Tafford, who misses her long-lost daughter. Mrs de Tafford adopts Jean and promotes her in society. Jean attends a garden party and government house and is sent to a boarding school to complete her education. She discovers that she is in fact Mrs de Tafford's long-lost daughter.

Cast

Edith Crowe as Jean
Mrs Ernest Good as Mrs de Tafford
Price Weir as Colonel de Tafford
Herbert Walsh as Reg Stanton
James Anderson as Dad Smith
Ethelwyn Robin as Mum Smith
Janet Ward as Stella
Rita Crowe as maid
Victor Fitzherbert as Ashbourne
Roth Martin as George
Hartley Williams as Jasper
Harold Rivaz as Jabez
Darcy Kelway as Bertie

Many members of Adelaide society also appeared, including South Australia's Premier Peake.

Production
The film was made by the South Australian Trench Comforts Fund to raise money for charity. It was intended for South Australian audiences only and deliberately featured many local landmarks. Most of the cast and crew were amateurs.

Reception
The film was hyped through a series of ads in Adelaide papers simply asking "what happened to Jean?" It received a gala premiere, attended by the Premier, Governor General, and leading members of Adelaide society.

The film was well received in Adelaide and raised a reported £2,000.

References

External links

1918 films
Australian drama films
Australian black-and-white films
Australian silent feature films
Lost Australian films
1918 drama films
1918 lost films
Lost drama films
Silent drama films
1910s English-language films